The University Athletic Association of the Philippines Season 72 basketball tournaments are the basketball events of UAAP's 2009–10 season.

Far Eastern University was the season host and the tournament kicked off with a doubleheader on July 11 at the Araneta Coliseum. At the conclusion of the season, the Ateneo Blue Eagles and the Ateneo Blue Eaglets successfully defended their men's and juniors' championships, beating the UE Red Warriors and the De La Salle Junior Archers in the Finals; the Adamson Lady Falcons reclaimed the women's championship beating the defending champions FEU Lady Tamaraws in their own Finals series.

ABS-CBN UHF channel Studio 23 broadcast the men's tournament for the tenth consecutive year, and renewed their contract with the UAAP for another five years.

Preseason
NCAA Season 84 commissioner Joe Lipa will take over from last season's commissioner Chito Narvasa this season after he was appointed by the UAAP Board.

Major rule changes are:
Instituting a more thorough system in breaking ties after the elimination round to determine seedings,
Teams may now challenge the validity of a three-point field goal at any point of the game via instant replay,
During the final two minutes of the game and in overtime, jump ball situations will be settled by a jump ball in the necessary area (free-throw lane or center circle). The possession arrow will be turned off and is not in use.

Major rules that are retained are:
The adhesive pro-grip is still banned.
Teams are still limited to two foreign nationals in their rosters, with only one allowed to play at a time.

League president Anton Montinola of Far Eastern University said that the method in breaking ties will use "common sense" as the tournament is prolonged by holding unnecessary matches.

Commissioner Joe Lipa also instructed referees, which come from Philippine Basketball Association, Philippine Basketball League and BRAASCU, to limit unnecessary technical fouls. Furthermore, a "no ID, no sitting on the bench rule" will be implemented to avoid what happened last season when La Salle coach Franz Pumaren was slapped a technical foul for not wearing his ID. Lipa said that the referees "must have the integrity" and their diverse backgrounds should not be a drawback for Lipa had been an advocate of having diverse groups of referees participating in a single tournament "instead of having the attitude of being parochial."

Due to the high demand of tickets for Ateneo-La Salle games, host FEU has devised a way for allocating tickets for fans of the two schools, although the Ateneo-La Salle game will still be a part of a doubleheader, tickets will be sold separately for the Ateneo-La Salle and the following FEU-UE game. The patrons who only have tickets for one game has to watch only the game stated on their tickets and has to leave when the other game is being held. The two-hour gap between the games was to allow Araneta Coliseum personnel to clear the arena for the second game. During last year's finals series between Ateneo and La Salle, the crowd was estimated to be at least 22,000.

Men's tournament

Teams

Elimination round

Team standings

Match-up results

Results

Bracket

Semifinals

Ateneo vs. UST
The Ateneo Blue Eagles had the twice-to-beat advantage.

FEU vs. UE
The FEU Tamaraws had the twice-to-beat advantage.

Finals

Finals Most Valuable Player:

Awards 

Most Valuable Player: 
Rookie of the Year:

Women's tournament
The women's tournament started on July 15 with most of the games played at the Far Eastern University Gym in Manila.

Elimination round

Team standings

Match-up results

Results

Second–seed playoff

Bracket

Semifinals

Finals

Finals Most Valuable Player:

Awards 

Most Valuable Player: 
Rookie of the Year:

Juniors' tournament

Elimination round

Team standings

Match-up results

Results

Bracket

Semifinals

DLSZ vs. FEU–FERN
DLSZ has the twice-to-beat advantage.

UST vs. Ateneo
UST has the twice-to-beat advantage.

Finals

Finals Most Valuable Player:

Awards 

Most Valuable Player: 
Rookie of the Year:

See also
NCAA Season 85 basketball tournaments

References

External links
UAAP Season 72 - Official ABS-CBN website
UBelt.com
UAAP on Inboundpass.com

71
2009–10 in Philippine college basketball
Basket